This is a list of listed buildings in East Lothian. The list is split out by parish.

 List of listed buildings in Aberlady, East Lothian
 List of listed buildings in Athelstaneford, East Lothian
 List of listed buildings in Bolton, East Lothian
 List of listed buildings in Cockenzie And Portseton, East Lothian
 List of listed buildings in Dirleton, East Lothian
 List of listed buildings in Dunbar, East Lothian
 List of listed buildings in East Linton, East Lothian
 List of listed buildings in Garvald And Bara, East Lothian
 List of listed buildings in Gladsmuir, East Lothian
 List of listed buildings in Haddington, East Lothian
 List of listed buildings in Humbie, East Lothian
 List of listed buildings in Innerwick, East Lothian
 List of listed buildings in Inveresk, East Lothian
 List of listed buildings in Morham, East Lothian
 List of listed buildings in Musselburgh, East Lothian
 List of listed buildings in North Berwick, East Lothian
 List of listed buildings in Oldhamstocks, East Lothian
 List of listed buildings in Ormiston, East Lothian
 List of listed buildings in Pencaitland, East Lothian
 List of listed buildings in Prestonkirk, East Lothian
 List of listed buildings in Prestonpans, East Lothian
 List of listed buildings in Saltoun, East Lothian
 List of listed buildings in Spott, East Lothian
 List of listed buildings in Stenton, East Lothian
 List of listed buildings in Tranent, East Lothian
 List of listed buildings in Whitekirk And Tyninghame, East Lothian
 List of listed buildings in Whittingehame, East Lothian
 List of listed buildings in Yester, East Lothian

East Lothian